The Khtada River is a tributary of the Skeena River in the North Coast Regional District of the province of British Columbia, Canada.

Major mountain peaks in and around the Khtada's watershed include Cooper Peak, Sillimanite Needle, and Spinel Peak.

The Khtada River's watershed is within the traditional territory of the Tsimshian Lax-kw'alaams First Nation and the Metlakatla First Nation.

Geography
The Khtada River originates in an unnamed lake from which it flows north and northwest, through Khtada Lake and Davis Lake, reaching the Skeena River just east of the mouth of the Scotia River.

The Khtada River's watershed's land cover is classified as 33.2% Coniferous, 28.6% Barren, 12.6% Herb, 9.3% Snow/Glacier, and 6.6% Shrub.

The Indian reserves Khtahda 10, of the Lax Kw'alaams and Metlakatla First Nations, is located at the mouth of the Khtada River.

Natural history
The Khtada River supports runs of steelhead trout and eulachon.

See also
List of British Columbia rivers

References 

North Coast Regional District
Rivers of British Columbia
Rivers of the Kitimat Ranges
Rivers of the North Coast of British Columbia
Skeena Country
Tsimshian